American rapper Will Smith has released four studio albums, one compilation album, 18 singles (12 as lead artist and five as featured artist), one video album and 20 music videos (14 as lead artist, three as featured artist and three guest appearances). After working in the late 1980s and early 1990s with Jeff Townes as DJ Jazzy Jeff & The Fresh Prince, Smith began his solo career in 1997 with the release of "Men in Black", the theme song for the film of the same name, which topped singles charts in several regions across the world, including the UK. "Men in Black" (and second single "Just Cruisin'") was later included on Smith's debut solo album Big Willie Style, which reached the top ten of the US Billboard 200 and was certified nine times platinum by the Recording Industry Association of America (RIAA). The third single from the album, "Gettin' Jiggy wit It", became Smith's first Billboard Hot 100 number one when it was released in 1998.

Smith's second album was again supported by the release of a film theme song as the lead single: "Wild Wild West", featuring Dru Hill and Kool Moe Dee, topped the Billboard Hot 100 and was certified gold by the RIAA. The album in question, Willennium, reached number five on the Billboard 200 and was certified double platinum by the RIAA. "Will 2K", the second single from the album, reached number 25 on the Billboard Hot 100. Before the end of 1999, a video album was released featuring Smith's seven music videos released to date, which reached number 25 on the UK Music Video Chart. The same year, the rapper was also featured on The Fresh Prince of Bel-Air co-star Tatyana Ali's single "Boy You Knock Me Out", which reached number three on the UK Singles Chart and topped the UK R&B Singles Chart.

In 2002, Smith returned with his third album Born to Reign, which reached number 13 on the Billboard 200 and was certified gold by the RIAA. The album's lead single was Men in Black II theme song "Black Suits Comin' (Nod Ya Head)", which reached number three on the UK Singles Chart. Later in the year, Smith's first compilation album Greatest Hits was released, featuring songs from his three solo albums as well as those produced with DJ Jazzy Jeff. Smith's latest album Lost and Found was released in 2005, peaking at number six on the Billboard 200. Lead single "Switch" reached the top ten of both the Billboard Hot 100 and the UK Singles Chart.

Smith released his first single in over ten years, "Get Lit", on October 6, 2017.

Albums

Studio albums

Compilation albums

Video albums

Singles

As lead artist

As featured artist

Promotional singles

Other charted songs

Guest appearances

Music videos

See also
DJ Jazzy Jeff & The Fresh Prince discography

Notes

References

External links
Will Smith discography at AllMusic
Will Smith discography at Discogs
Will Smith discography at MusicBrainz

Discography
Smith, Will
Smith, Will